Lukáš Dlouhý and Paul Hanley were the defending champions but decided not to participate together.
Dlouhý played alongside Marcelo Melo (lost in the first round to Tommy Haas and Radek Štěpánek), while Hanley partnered up with Jamie Murray (eliminated in the Quarterfinals to Robert Lindstedt and Horia Tecău).

First seeds Max Mirnyi and Daniel Nestor won the title, defeating second seeds Jürgen Melzer and Philipp Petzschner in the final.

Seeds

Draw

References
 Main Draw

Brisbane International - Doubles
Men's Doubles